Louis-Trefflé Dorais (March 19, 1835 – January 2, 1907) was a merchant and political figure in Quebec. He represented Nicolet in the Legislative Assembly of Quebec from 1883 to 1888 as an independent conservative.

He was born in Sainte-Martine, Lower Canada, the son of Léon Dorais and Félicité Lamagdelaine, and was educated there. He was an exporter and dealer in hay. In 1856, he married Marie-Louise-Elmire Poisson. Dorais was postmaster at Warwick. In 1872, he moved to Saint-Grégoire. He ran unsuccessfully for a seat in the Quebec assembly in 1881, losing to Charles-Édouard Houde. After the election of Houde was overturned in 1883, Dorais defeated Houde in the by-election that followed. His election in 1886 was overturned by the Quebec Superior Court in 1888; he did not run in the by-election which followed. From 1888 to 1896, Dorais was director of public works for the federal government at Sorel. In 1896, he moved to Montreal; he died there at the age of 71 and was buried in the Notre Dame des Neiges Cemetery.

His daughter Corinne married Louis-Edmond Panneton. After his death in 1907, he was entombed at the Notre Dame des Neiges Cemetery in Montreal.

References
 

1830s births
1980 deaths
Independent MNAs in Quebec
Burials at Notre Dame des Neiges Cemetery